Boraldai Airport (former name Burundai)  is situated within  of Almaty, Kazakhstan. The owner of the airport is LLP "Altair Air". The airport is a main base for Kazakhstan airline Burundaiavia. The annual airshow of Kazakhstan takes place at the airport.

Facilities
It is suitable for helicopters of all types, such as Mi-2, Mi-6, Mi-8, Mi-10, Ka-32 and light aircraft, such as An-24, An-26, An-30, An-72 and An-74.

External links 
 
 Annual Air-show of Kazakhstan.

Airports in Kazakhstan
Airport Boraldai